The Redeye River is a tributary of the Leaf River,  long, in central Minnesota in the United States. The river's name comes from the Native Americans of the area, who saw many red-eye fish in the river.

Geography
The Redeye River rises in a morainic region, issuing from Wolf Lake in Toad Lake Township in southeastern Becker County. The river's course is within the North Central Hardwood Forest ecoregion, which is characterized by hardwood forests of maple and basswood mixed with conifers, on outwash plains and moraines amid flat glacial lakes.

See also
List of rivers in Minnesota

References

Rivers of Minnesota
Rivers of Becker County, Minnesota
Rivers of Otter Tail County, Minnesota
Rivers of Wadena County, Minnesota
Tributaries of the Mississippi River